Piet Stevens (13 December 1897 – 26 October 1970) was a Dutch footballer. He played in three matches for the Netherlands national football team in 1921.

References

External links
 

1897 births
1970 deaths
Dutch footballers
Netherlands international footballers
Association footballers not categorized by position